Dale M. Foreman is an American politician, attorney, and farmer from Washington. Foreman is a former Republican Party member of Washington State House of Representatives. Foreman is the founder of Foreman Fruit Company.

Education 
In 1975, Foreman earned a J.D. degree from Harvard Law School.

Career 
As a farmer, Foreman is a fruit grower in Washington. Foreman's company is Foreman Fruit Company (formerly Keystone Ranch), which farms 2,000 acres of apples, pears and cherries. Foreman is a former chairman of the U.S. Apple Association.

Foreman served as majority leader of the Washington State House of Representatives and as chair of the Washington State Republican Party. A Republican, Foreman was an unsuccessful candidate for Governor of Washington in the 1996 election.

Awards 
 2013 Apple Citizen of the Year. Presented at Washington State Apple Blossom Festival.

Personal life 
Foreman's wife is Gail Foreman.

References

External links 
 Dale Foreman at ourcampaigns.com
 Dale Foreman at fhbzlaw.com
 Dale Foreman at freshplaza.com
 Foreman Fruit Company in Spokesman.com

Farmers from Washington (state)
Living people
Republican Party members of the Washington House of Representatives
State political party chairs of Washington (state)
People from Wenatchee, Washington
Washington (state) lawyers
Year of birth missing (living people)
Harvard Law School alumni